Quli (zhuang: Gizlij Cin) is a town under the administration of Fusui County in southern Guangxi Zhuang Autonomous Region, China. , it had an area of  populated by 48,195 people residing in 2 residential communities and 16 villages.

Administrative divisions
There are 2 residential communities and 16 villages:

Residential communities:
 Quli(渠黎社区), China-ASEAN Youth Industrial Park(中国东盟青年产业园社区)

Villages:
 Liansui(联绥村), Quduo(渠哆村), Tuohe(驮河村), Xinan(新安村), Basang(岜桑村), Buyao(布尧村), Nale(那勒村), Nongping(弄平村), Qushi(渠莳村), Wangzhuang(汪庄村), Daling(大陵村), Leilong(蕾陇村), Dubang(笃邦村), Quxin(渠新村), Biji(必计村), Qufeng(渠凤村)

See also
List of township-level divisions of Guangxi

References

External links
 Quli Town/Official website of Quli

Towns of Guangxi
Fusui County